Tony "Wild T" Springer is a Trinidadian/Canadian blues-rock guitarist.

Early life

Springer was born and raised in Trinidad and Tobago; he played with a number of reggae and calypso bands as a teenager.

Career
Springer later moved to Canada, settling in Toronto and playing local clubs in a Jimi Hendrix tribute band. He joined Rough Trade in 1986 as the band was becoming less active; they broke up in 1988.

In 1990 Springer took on the stage name Wild T, and launched his own band, Wild T and the Spirit. In 1992 Wild T was nominated for a Juno award as most promising male vocalist. Springer also appeared as a guest musician on David Bowie's 1993 album Black Tie White Noise.

Wild T & the Spirit had several lineups over the years, and released a number of albums, including Givin' Blood, which was nominated for a Juno Award in 1994. The band toured in Europe, Canada and the United States, and continues to perform and record as of 2017.

References

External links
 Wild T
 Wild T & The Spirit Official Myspace

Black Canadian musicians
Canadian blues guitarists
Canadian male guitarists
Canadian rock guitarists
Living people
Trinidad and Tobago expatriates in Canada
Trinidad and Tobago musicians
Year of birth missing (living people)
Rough Trade (band) members